Plagiothyridae is an extinct family of fossil sea snails, marine gastropod mollusks in the superfamily Neritopsoidea.

Genera
Genera in the family Plagiothyridae include: 
 Dirachis
 Grabinopsis
 Littorinides
 Plagiothyra, the type genus

References

Prehistoric gastropods